The 2014 Assen Superbike World Championship round was the third round of the 2014 Superbike World Championship. It took place over the weekend of 25–27 April 2014 at the TT Circuit Assen located in Assen, Netherlands.

Superbike

Race 1 classification

Notes:
 — Bimota entries were not eligible to score points and were removed from the race results.

Race 2 classification

Notes:
 — Bimota entries were not eligible to score points and were removed from the race results.

Supersport

Race classification

References

External links
 The official website of the Superbike World Championship

2014 in Dutch sport
2014 Superbike World Championship season